Kumbakonam Swaminatha Pillai Krishnamurthy (1914-1990) was an Indian poet, lyricist, writer, novelist, and screenplay writer for Tamil Language films and plays.

He was born on 19 May 1914 to Swaminatha Pillai and Meenakshi Ammal.

works 

 Amutha Tamizhisai
 Arutpa isaiamudham
 Andhaman Kaidhi
 Isai inbam
 Paruva Mazhai
 Tamil Nadaga Varalaru
 Kalaivanan (play)

His works are nationalised by the Government of Tamil Nadu.

He wrote the screenplay for the movie Andhaman Kaidhi and the lyrics for many Tamil movie songs.

References 

1990 deaths
1914 births
Tamil writers
Indian lyricists
Indian novelists
20th-century novelists